Clive Marshall (born 1 January 1939) is a British rower. He competed in the men's coxless pair event at the 1960 Summer Olympics.

References

1939 births
Living people
British male rowers
Olympic rowers of Great Britain
Rowers at the 1960 Summer Olympics
Sportspeople from Nottingham